The Dürrestein Formation is a Carnian geologic formation in Italy. Fossil prosauropod tracks have been reported from the formation.

Fossil content 
The following fossils have been reported from the formation:
Sponges

 Atrochaetetes medius
 Cryptocoelia zitteli
 Jablonskyia andrusovi
 Sestrostomella robusta
 Uvanella irregularis
 Amblisyphonella sp.
 Colospongia sp.
 Dendronella sp.
 Solenopora sp.
 Stellinspongia sp.

Corals
 Margarosmilia zieteni
 Margarosmilia sp.

See also 
 List of dinosaur-bearing rock formations
 List of stratigraphic units with sauropodomorph tracks
 Prosauropod tracks
 List of fossiliferous stratigraphic units in Italy

References

Bibliography 
 
  

Geologic formations of Italy
Triassic System of Europe
Carnian Stage
Limestone formations
Reef deposits
Ichnofossiliferous formations
Paleontology in Italy
Southern Limestone Alps